Luis Villanueva Páramo (June 21, 1913 – March 16, 2002) was a Mexican boxer best known as Kid Azteca. Villanueva boxed professionally from 1932 to 1961, making him one of a small number of fighters that fought during four decades. Archie Moore, George Foreman, Roberto Durán and Bernard Hopkins and Roy Jones Jr. (nearly 5 decades) are five other fighters in that exclusive group.

Background
Luis Villanueva was a native of "The Tough Neighborhood" of Tepito, one of the most notorious neighborhoods in Mexico City, famous among other things because several international famous Mexican boxers and wrestlers were born at that place, (hence the reason why it is called "Tough Neighborhood").

There's not much information available about of his personal life or his beginnings in before he became a pro. In fact, there's some discrepancy about the exact date of his debut. Some sources indicates he became Pro in 1926, other sources indicates his pro debut was July 25, 1930, but officially, it is recorded at 1932. The San Antonio Express reported in 1944 that Villanueva's passport's birth date was June 21, 1917, and not June 21, 1913. If this is true, he was only 13 when started his career.

He was a right-handed boxer. Luis Villanueva began fighting as "Kid Chino" in Laredo, Texas. "Chino" is a Mexican slang for "curly", and an allusion to his curled hair. It is not clear when his nickname changed, but it is possible it was due to his nationality, when fighting in Texas, in an effort to attract more attention over him. By 1927 he was widely known as Kid Azteca. His trainer at that date was Macario Azocar.

Boxing career
Kid Azteca began boxing on January 1, 1932. He knocked Carlos Garcia out in the first round, in Laredo, Texas. On March 3, and fighting only in his third fight, he beat former world champion Battling Shaw by a decision in ten, also in Laredo.

On June 15, Azteca made his Mexican debut, beating Luis Arizona by a ten round decision in Mexico City. However, on his next bout, lost for the first time, being knocked out in eight rounds by Tommy White on July 1.

On October 23, Azteca, having reeled off four straight victories, fought for a title for the first time. He beat David Velasco by a twelve round decision to obtain the national Welterweight title in Mexico City. Kid Azteca had eleven additional wins in a row, including a victory over Joe Glick, before he fought the future world Middleweight champion Ceferino Garcia on July 11, 1933 at the Olympic Auditorium in Los Angeles, California. He beat Garcia, who would hold Henry Armstrong to a tie as world Middleweight champion, by a ten round decision. Azteca and Garcia held a rematch exactly fourteen days later, at the same location. On rematch, Kid Azteca knocked Garcia out in round eight.

On June 5, 1934, Azteca fought Young Peter Jackson (named after an Australian Heavyweight contender of the 19th century), beating Jackson on points after ten rounds. On July 21, he confronted Baby Joe Gans, another popular fighter of that time, outpointing Gans over ten rounds.

Azteca gradually became a national hero in Mexico after his victory over Garcia. By the time he beat Gans, he was widely regarded as Mexico's most popular fighter of his time. He fought  Herbert "Cocoa Kid" Lewis Hardwick, a top rated challenger twice in one week at the beginning of 1935: On January 19, the pair would tie over ten rounds. On January 26, Azteca prevailed on points. On his next bout, he defeated Izzy Jannazzo, another ranked fighter of the time, by a decision in ten on March 2.

Kid Azteca had twelve more bouts, including a successful defense of his Mexican Welterweight title, before he met Rodolfo Casanova (who had lost to Sixto Escobar for the world's Bantamweight title) on May 16, 1936. Azteca lost to Casanova by a ten round decision. In his next fight, July 17 of that year, Kid Azteca faced Ceferino Garcia for the third time, losing by knockout in round five.

Azteca proceeded to win twenty seven of his next thirty one bouts, before meeting future world Welterweight champion Fritzie Zivic on November 24, 1939, losing a decision over ten rounds to Zivic in Houston, Texas.

On December 13, 1940, Azteca and Bobby Pacho, who challenged for a world championship one time, fought to a ten round tie in San Antonio, Texas. Next came two more bouts with Cocoa Kid. These bouts once again took place ten days apart from each other. On January 1, 1941, Azteca won by ten round decision, and on January 11, the two rivals fought to a 10 round no contest.

Azteca lived for a year in Argentina, where he made six fights, five of them in Buenos Aires. Azteca's debut in that South American country came on April 11, 1943, when he knocked Sebastian Romanos out in round nine.

On November 6, 1944, Azteca had a fourth fight with Ceferino Garcia, being defeated by decision in ten at Mexico City. Despite having a five fight losing streak and having lived in Argentina for a year, however, Azteca still held the Mexican Welterweight championship.

Azteca lost to Zivic two more times, both by decision, before actually beating him in their fourth encounter. This took place on February 15, 1947 in Mexico City, and Azteca was able to knock Zivic out in the fifth round. On March 19, Azteca fought Vincente Villavincencio in an unsuccessful bid to conquer the Mexican Middleweight title, being knocked out in round six. He beat Villavincencio in two subsequent fights, both times by decision over ten rounds.

On June 26, 1950, Azteca fought former world Lightweight champion Sammy Angott, losing to the American boxer by points after ten rounds.

With the advent of the television era during the 1950s, Azteca's popularity in Mexico grew more than ever before. Most of his fights were televised, and boxing fans across the country could then watch him fight from their family rooms. Although Kid Azteca spent the rest of his career fighting mostly unknown fighters, his fights drew high ratings for Televisa, Mexico's only public television company at the time.

On February 3, 1961, Azteca knocked out Alfonso Macalara in the first round at Veracruz. This would turn out to be his last professional fight.

Azteca was able to reach a milestone as he became a member of the exclusive group to fight at least two hundred bouts. He also became a member of the also exclusive group of fighters that boxed during four decades, when he knocked Adrian Medieta in three rounds on July 12, 1960 in Pachuca. He retired a little after this date.

He died on March 16, 2002.

Professional boxing record
All information in this section is derived from BoxRec, unless otherwise stated.

Official record

All newspaper decisions are officially regarded as “no decision” bouts and are not counted in the win/loss/draw column.

Unofficial record

Record with the inclusion of newspaper decisions in the win/loss/draw column.

Success
 In 1933, Kid Azteca obtained the Mexican Welterweight title.
 Azteca was still remembered by his fans some twenty years after his last fight, the Spanish boxing publication Ring En Español featuring him many times on magazine articles.
 Azteca had 192 wins, 46 losses and 12 ties as a professional boxer, with 114 knockout wins. His knockouts made him a member of the exclusive group of fighters that won 50 or more fights by knockout through their careers, and it also constituted a knockout record for Hispanic fighters.

References

External links
 
 HBO Boxing

1913 births
2002 deaths
Mexican male boxers
Boxers from Mexico City
Welterweight boxers